Christopher Turner is an American politician from the state of Louisiana. A Republican, he represents the 12th district in the Louisiana House of Representatives.

Turner is from Ruston, Louisiana. He won a special election in February 2019 to succeed Robert Shadoin in the Louisiana House.

References

External links

Living people
People from Ruston, Louisiana
Republican Party members of the Louisiana House of Representatives
Year of birth missing (living people)